WPG is the city code for Winnipeg, Manitoba, Canada.

WPG also may refer to:
 Weight per gallon, a measure of density
 Weight percentage gain, a measurement in chemical wood preservation
 WordPerfect Graphics, a graphic format for WordPerfect word processor